Avon High School is a public high school located in Avon, Livingston County, New York.

Footnotes

Schools in Livingston County, New York
Public high schools in New York (state)